I've Already Loved You in My Mind is the thirty seventh studio album by American country music singer Conway Twitty. The album was released in 1977, by MCA Records.

Track listing

Charts

References

1977 albums
Conway Twitty albums
MCA Records albums
Albums produced by Owen Bradley